Two More Eggs is an American animated sketch comedy web series produced by The Brothers Chaps for Disney XD's YouTube channel and Disney XD. The Brothers Chaps previously produced the web series Homestar Runner. Two More Eggs is Disney's first animated web series.

The series debuted on June 23, 2015 with the release of the first three episodes, a trailer, and an official press release. It was announced that each new episode would be released on Tuesday of every week. Mostly being over a minute long, each episode centers on an individual character (e.g. "Dooble" or "Hot Dip") or a group of characters (e.g. "CGI Palz" or "Hector & Kovitch" or "Trauncles") and has no overarching plot or complexity. Matt Chapman claims that he and Mike worked with Disney with the same autonomy as with Homestar Runner.

In March 2016, it was announced that Two More Eggs was renewed for a second season, which premiered June 13, 2016 online. In August 2017, it was renewed for a third and final season, which premiered on August 21, 2017 online.

Series featured on Two More Eggs
Dooble: A potbellied man embarks on several misadventures, whether he knows it or not. 
Eggpo: In Dooble's video game, a newly hired eggpo learns the ins-and-outs of being a generic enemy, even if that means breaking the rules.
CGI Palz: A supposed TV show all about the wonders of being computer-generated.
Trauncles: A parody of soft-spoken British children's programs set in the titular town of Trauncles.
Hector & Kovitch: Two friends discuss some of their favorite things.
Hot Dip: A cool dip mascot helps a kid named Hayden with the challenges of teen social life, with less than useful results.
Bad Snaxx: A working mom shares her "food hacks" with the world, no matter how disgusting they are.
The Joshow Show/Joshow: A recently unemployed dad shows off his crafting skills, much to the embarrassment of his son.
Gankroar: A series of commercials for the titular toy robot and his furry alien pal named Cheeby.
New4Mobile: A series about an app for a mobile phone.
Poach & Scramble: Two eggs who can sing and dance. 
Hot Diggity: A parody of edutainment shows from the 1980s and 1990s.
Parental Notice: A parody of parental notices that are shown before Preschool shows.
Street Road Junction: A supposed TV show about anthropomorphic roads.
Panda Bractice: An all-girl RV band who are trying to be famous.
And some one-off shorts: Cutesycorns, Knight Bit, Francis Sweetmouth, Qblepon, World's Best, TurchKid03, Beef Stroganauts, and Grown-Ups Made Up By Kids.

Episodes

Season 1 (2015–16)

Season 2 (2016)

Season 3 (2017)

See also

Homestar Runner

References

External links
 
 Watch all episodes on YouTube (US)
 Watch all episodes on YouTube (UK)

2010s American animated television series
2010s American anthology television series
2010s American sketch comedy television series
2010s American surreal comedy television series
2015 American television series debuts
2015 web series debuts
American children's animated anthology television series
American children's animated comedy television series
American flash animated television series
American television series with live action and animation
American animated web series
Children's sketch comedy
English-language television shows
Disney XD original programming
Television series by Disney Television Animation